Shane Swartz (born December 27, 1975 in Fort Collins, CO) is an American former professional boxer who competed from 1996 to 2007.

Amateur career
Swartz began boxing under the guidance of his father Roger at the age of four.
He was an outstanding amateur, having won back-to-back gold medals at the 1993 and 1994 U.S. Olympic Festival. He was upset by Dana Rucker in the semifinals of the 1995 edition. Swartz was also the U.S. National Amateur Champion at 165 pounds in 1994 and 1995.

Professional career
Known as "Hurricane", Swartz began his professional career in 1996 and has had limited success. He moved up to the heavyweight division and has fought several notable foes, such as Calvin Brock and Malik Scott, but has generally come up short in his big fights.

Professional boxing record

|-
|align="center" colspan=8|18 Wins (12 knockouts, 6 decisions), 6 Losses (5 knockouts, 1 decision) 
|-
| align="center" style="border-style: none none solid solid; background: #e3e3e3"|Result
| align="center" style="border-style: none none solid solid; background: #e3e3e3"|Record
| align="center" style="border-style: none none solid solid; background: #e3e3e3"|Opponent
| align="center" style="border-style: none none solid solid; background: #e3e3e3"|Type
| align="center" style="border-style: none none solid solid; background: #e3e3e3"|Round
| align="center" style="border-style: none none solid solid; background: #e3e3e3"|Date
| align="center" style="border-style: none none solid solid; background: #e3e3e3"|Location
| align="center" style="border-style: none none solid solid; background: #e3e3e3"|Notes
|-align=center
|Loss
|
|align=left| Alexander Frenkel
|KO
|1
|18/08/2007
|align=left| Prenzlauer Berg, Berlin, Germany
|align=left|
|-
|Loss
|
|align=left| Vadim Tokarev
|KO
|2
|25/11/2006
|align=left| Warsaw, Poland
|align=left|
|-
|Win
|
|align=left| Dale Brown
|TD
|5
|30/06/2006
|align=left| Hollywood, Florida, United States
|align=left|
|-
|Win
|
|align=left| Benito Fernandez
|RTD
|3
|03/02/2006
|align=left| Sarasota, Florida, United States
|align=left|
|-
|Loss
|
|align=left| Grigory Drozd
|TKO
|7
|25/10/2005
|align=left| Vienna, Austria
|align=left|
|-
|Loss
|
|align=left| Malik Scott
|UD
|8
|23/04/2005
|align=left| Las Vegas, Nevada, United States
|align=left|
|-
|Loss
|
|align=left| Calvin Brock
|RTD
|6
|29/08/2003
|align=left| Reading, Pennsylvania, United States
|align=left|
|-
|Win
|
|align=left| George Stephens
|UD
|6
|18/05/2003
|align=left| Black Hawk, Colorado, United States
|align=left|
|-
|Loss
|
|align=left| David Robinson
|TKO
|2
|12/10/2001
|align=left| Colorado Springs, Colorado, United States
|align=left|
|-
|Win
|
|align=left| Ed Dalton
|TKO
|4
|04/08/2001
|align=left| Tacoma, Washington, United States
|align=left|
|-
|Win
|
|align=left| Richie Galvan
|TKO
|1
|13/07/2001
|align=left| Colorado Springs, Colorado, United States
|align=left|
|-
|Win
|
|align=left| Joe Escamilla
|TKO
|4
|12/11/2000
|align=left| Denver, Colorado, United States
|align=left|
|-
|Win
|
|align=left| Rich Maciel
|KO
|2
|06/10/2000
|align=left| Loveland, Colorado, United States
|align=left|
|-
|Win
|
|align=left| Martin Lopez
|TKO
|2
|15/09/2000
|align=left| Denver, Colorado, United States
|align=left|
|-
|Win
|
|align=left| Joe Escamilla
|TKO
|3
|27/08/2000
|align=left| Black Hawk, Colorado, United States
|align=left|
|-
|Win
|
|align=left| Steve Robinson
|TD
|3
|26/02/1997
|align=left| Denver, Colorado, United States
|align=left|
|-
|Win
|
|align=left| Tyrone Jackson
|PTS
|6
|21/01/1997
|align=left| Biloxi, Mississippi, United States
|align=left|
|-
|Win
|
|align=left| Angelo Simpson
|UD
|6
|16/12/1996
|align=left| Fort Collins, Colorado, United States
|align=left|
|-
|Win
|
|align=left| Franklin Edmondson
|UD
|6
|12/08/1996
|align=left| Saratoga Springs, New York, United States
|align=left|
|-
|Win
|
|align=left| Cecil Hagins
|KO
|2
|13/07/1996
|align=left| Denver, Colorado, United States
|align=left|
|-
|Win
|
|align=left| Ed Bryant
|TKO
|1
|12/06/1996
|align=left| Atlantic City, New Jersey, United States
|align=left|
|-
|Win
|
|align=left| Jim Tanner
|KO
|1
|03/06/1996
|align=left| Fort Collins, Colorado, United States
|align=left|
|-
|Win
|
|align=left| Vince Foster
|KO
|2
|18/05/1996
|align=left| South Dakota, United States
|align=left|
|-
|Win
|
|align=left| Maurice Morris
|TKO
|1
|10/05/1996
|align=left| Boston, Massachusetts, United States
|align=left|
|}

References

External links
 

1975 births
Living people
American male boxers
Heavyweight boxers
Winners of the United States Championship for amateur boxers
Boxers from Colorado
Sportspeople from Fort Collins, Colorado